Dorothy Hutton  (21 November 1889 – 1984) was an English painter, calligrapher and printmaker, best known for her London Transport posters.

Early life and education
Hutton was born in Bolton, Lancashire, daughter of the Reverend F.R.C. Hutton. She was educated at Queen Margaret's School, York. She studied architecture, and in the 1920s, she attended the Central School of Arts and Crafts, studying with F Ernest Jackson.

Career
Hutton worked in several media for many years including calligraphy and printmaking. Among her works of calligraphy is the gold lettering on the war memorial tablet in the church at Great Horwood in Buckinghamshire, the Metropolitan Police Roll of Honour, on which she collaborated with Vera Law, and a map of the Cotswolds, with most of the towns indicated by churches. Hutton entered the Daily Mail Exhibition of Village Signs in 1920 and  won £200 as a third prize, out of 617 entries, for her sign for Battle, Sussex. Hutton opened the Three Shields Gallery in Holland Street, London, exhibiting prints, drawings and, watercolors, and selling cards she designed, such as a Holly Bush series of tags for Christmas presents and place names for children's parties.

Hutton exhibited widely in the 1930s and 1940s and at the Royal Academy in London for nearly fifty years, from 1923 to 1970. She also exhibited with the New English Art Club and at the Walker Art Gallery in Liverpool. She was a co-founder, in 1921, of the Society of Scribes and Illuminators and was also a member of the Arts & Crafts Exhibition Society.

Well known for her depiction of flowers, Hutton was commissioned by London Transport between 1922 and 1954, for a series of seasonal posters advertising flowers in bloom throughout the city. Hutton was the official artist to the Crown Office and among other works, responsible for a memorial to General Dwight Eisenhower in Bushy Park in West London. From 1964 she was a member of the Art Workers' Guild.

In the 1959 New Year Honours, Hutton was appointed a Member of the Royal Victorian Order, fifth class. She lived in Chelsea, London and at her memorial service, held on 20 June 1984 at the Queen's Chapel of the Savoy, the chaplain to the Royal Victorian Order officiated.

Collections
Both the British Museum and the Victoria and Albert Museum in London hold examples of her prints while the London Transport Museum collection includes her 1935 poster Heather Time. The Whitworth Art Gallery and the University of the Arts London also hold works by Hutton.

References

1889 births
1984 deaths
20th-century English painters
20th-century English women artists
People from Bolton
People educated at Queen Margaret's School, York
Alumni of the Central School of Art and Design